Acmaeodera is a genus of beetles in the family Buprestidae, a group of metallic wood-boring beetles favored by insect collectors. Whereas most beetles including most buprestids fly with their elytra held out and vibrating their hindwings to give lift and thrust, Acmaedodera, however, fly with their hind wings only — the elytra are fused down the center and form a shield over the insect's abdomen, even during flight. This fact, combined with the banding across the abdomen which is common (though not universal) in this family, gives many of them a distinct wasp-like appearance when in flight. Several are therefore considered hymenopteran mimics.

Species
The genus contains the following species:

References